Brian O'Connell is an American multi-instrumentalist, composer, arranger, record producer and actor.  He is the bassist and producer for Pakistani sufi rock band Junoon.

O'Connell and Salman Ahmad were friends of one another since high school. O'Connell joined Junoon when keyboardist, Nusrat Hussain, left the band and Salman Ahmad contacted and invited him to play bass on the band's second album, Talaash. He is known for harmonizing the western 5-string bass riffs with the traditional tabla and drums. After the release of the band's seventh studio album, Dewaar, O'Connell went back to his native land the United States.

Biography

Early years
O'Connell's musical roots stretch back to Tappan, New York. In 1978, O'Connell, then a sophomore at Tappan Zee High School, was invited by two classmates to join their band "Apple Corps", a group that played mostly Beatles covers. Shortly after O'Connell joined the band, Apple Corps changed its name to "Sloke", and modified its repertoire to include Led Zeppelin, Boston, and the Grateful Dead. In early 1979, O'Connell and other Sloke band members invited their friend Salman Ahmad to join the group. Ahmad had only recently taken up the guitar, but was already good enough to play with the band at a Tappan Zee High School talent festival in February 1979. That performance marked the first time that O'Connell and Ahmad performed together publicly. Following the departure of Sloke's bassist several months later, O'Connell and Ahmad formed a new band, "Eclipse". Before the two could take their aspirations onto a bigger stage, Ahmad's parents moved back to Pakistan in 1981, and Ahmad began to study medicine at Lahore's King Edward's Medical College.

Junoon (1992-2003)
After Junoon released their self-titled debut album Nusrat Hussain departed from the band and then Salman Ahmad contacted O'Connell and invited him to play bass on the band's second album. O'Connell quit his job as a social worker and traveled to Karachi, Pakistan, where he reunited with his old friend. It was after ten years the friends reunited. In 1992, the band started working on their second studio album. The album was recorded and mixed at Tahir Gul Hasan's Sound On Sound recording studios in Karachi. While working on their second album at one side, on the other hand the band also featured in a television series, Talaash, directed by Atiqa Odho and written by Anwar Maqsood, based on the true story of the band in which the band members acted themselves and due to its novel storyline it became an extremely popular television series in Pakistan.

O'Connell continued to play for Junoon until their seventh studio album, Dewaar, the album which last featured the trio together. However, after the release of the album O'Connell went back to United States.

Junoon 20th anniversary (2011)
On August 12, in an interview with The Express Tribune Salman Ahmad confirmed that he is set to celebrate Junoon's 20th anniversary with the band's former bassist Brian O Connell. “We are reaching Junoon’s 20th anniversary, so I’m excited about more projects coming up regarding that,” Ahmad told The Express Tribune. Ahmad also confirmed that Junoon's 20th anniversary celebration concert will be held at the Asia Society on September 24 in New York City. The band announced that it will release an album to mark two decades of Junoon. The album will be featuring Strings, Bilal Khan, Aag, Outlandish, Usman Riaz and Laal’s Taimur Rahman. Shoaib Mansoor will be writing lyrics for the band's anniversary album.

Discography

With Junoon
Talaash (1993)
Kashmakash (1995)
Inquilaab (1996)
Azadi (1997)
Parvaaz (1999)
Millennium 1990-2000 (2000)
Andaz (2001)
Daur-e-Junoon (2002)
Junoon for Peace (2002)
Dewaar (2003)
Dewaar: The Best of Junoon (2004)
Junoon 20 (2011)

Filmography
Talaash (1992)
United for Peace (2001)
Islamabad: Rock City (2001)

References

External links
Official Website

Living people
American rock bass guitarists
American male bass guitarists
American rock guitarists
American male guitarists
Junoon (band) members
People from Tappan, New York
Place of birth missing (living people)
American expatriate musicians in Pakistan
Guitarists from New York (state)
20th-century American guitarists
1963 births